Buldožer (meaning "bulldozer"), was a Yugoslav-Slovenian progressive rock band from the 1970s and 1980s. They were one of the first bands in communist Yugoslavia that could be considered Avant-prog, and forefathers of the Yugoslav new wave. In musical sense, they experimented with a variety of genres, while most of their lyrics, written in Serbo-Croatian, were a satire and mockery of the political and musical establishment, themselves included.

Their appearance on the Yugoslav musical scene in the early 1970s was "equal to the appearance of flying saucers with Martians". They jumped into the musical scene, which was attempting to keep up with the global trend of symphonic rock, creatively self-confident and implementing fresh ideas. Buldožer offered humorous lyrics, sometimes on the verge of lunacy, instead of the prevailing pathos and drawn-out solo sections common in progressive rock at the time. Frank Zappa was admittedly one of the band's models, and Buldožer's style was often subject to comparisons with his.

Career 
In early 1975 in Ljubljana, modern-day Slovenia, singer/songwriter Marko Brecelj joined the band Sedem Svetlobnih Let ("Seven Light Years"), led by guitarist and lead vocalist Boris Bele. The original line-up included keyboardist/composer Borut Činč, bass guitarist Andrej Veble, lead guitarist Uroš Lovšin and drummer Stefan Jež. The band received great success on their first appearance at the Boom Festival, and were offered a record contract by Yugoslavian record label Jugoton, whom they rejected in favor of PGP-RTB, reckoning that they will be better accepted on the Serbian market. Although the first album, Pljuni istini u oči (Spit the into the Eyes of Truth), featuring hits like "Život to je feferon", "Ljubav na prvi krevet" and "Blues gnjus", was quickly sold, the company rejected reissuing, as the record was marked by "higher instances" of "inappropriate and controversial [material]".

Additionally they were also ignored by the media, but their freak image was well received live. Although they introduced themselves as a "typical folk-pop ensemble from Slovenia", Marko Brecelj, one of the band's frontmen, was often making unpredictable excesses like appearing on stage in a wheelchair, burning his hair and beard, and holding long tirades loaded with cynicism and irony. In spite of this, he received the award the "Seven Secretaries of SKOJ" in 1976 for his solo-album Cocktail.

Such antics did not go without criticism, and some lyrics were censored during the recording of their second album. Among other things, they were asked to change the word "nirvana" into "kafana". The second album Zabranjeno plakatirati (No Placateering) was delayed for a year, until Helidon from Ljubljana intervened and issued it. It featured songs "Ne brini mama", "Helga" and "Dobro jutro madam Jovanović". By a mysterious chain of events, the band also received the Golden Arena for Best Film Music award on the Pula Film Festival for the Živi bili pa vidjeli soundtrack in 1979. In the meantime, the rhythm section changed, bassist Vili Bertok and drummer Tone Dimnik participating in studio sessions.

The same year, Brecelj left the band wishing to make a solo-career, and Bele took over as frontman. He sought to prove himself, and continued in Brecelj's style of excesses and provocation. The double live album Ako ste slobodni večeras (If You're Available Tonight) features great examples of these antics. Made-up interviews of Dražen Vrdoljak with the "public" acted as interludes between songs. These addressed favorite Buldožer topics and themes: sex, drugs and Goran Bregović. The album contained covers of "Roll Over Beethoven", renamed to "Ko jebe Buldožer" (Fuck the Buldožer), and verses from Pink Floyd's "Another Brick in the Wall" were sung to the melody of "Oj, svijetla majska zoro". Arguably the greatest excess on the record, though, was Bele's long obituary to Džoni Štulić, who supposedly burned himself as sign of protest for the Poland crisis.

Bele took over the position of chief music editor of Helidon label and managed to purchase the copyrights of their debut from PGP RTB, so the reissue came up in 1981. The band's activity slowly diminished in mid-1980s, after the album Nevino srce. They never officially broke up though, and their "comeback" album Noć was released more than 10 years later, in 1995. Regathering of the band for an ex-Yugoslavian tour is announced for the second half of 2006.

Discography 
Pljuni istini u oči (Spit into the Eyes of Truth), PGP-RTB, (1975)
Zabranjeno plakatirati (No placateering), Helidon, (1977)
Živi bili pa vidjeli (soundtrack), Helidon, (1979)
Izlog jeftinih slatkiša (Shop Window of Cheap Sweets), Helidon, (1980)
Rok end roul-Olstars bend (Rock and Roll All Stars Band), EP, Helidon (1981)
Ako ste slobodni večeras (If You're Available Tonight) live, Helidon (1982)
Nevino srce (Innocent Heart) Helidon (1983)
Nova vremena (New Times) Helidon (compilation, 1989)
Noć (Night) Helidon (1995)

References

External links 
Fan website

Slovenian new wave musical groups
Slovenian rock music groups
Slovenian progressive rock groups
Golden Arena winners
Yugoslav rock music groups
Musical groups established in 1975
Musical groups from Ljubljana